The Church of the Madonna del Terremoto (Madonna of the Earthquake) is a small Baroque style, Roman Catholic church in central Mantua, region of Lombardy, Italy.

The small votive church was built in 1754 in gratitude to the Virgin for her perceived protection after the 1693 Sicily earthquake. The Baroque church contained, at one time, two altarpieces by Giuseppe Bazzani,  the Adoration by the Shepherds  and  a Pietà. They are now in the Diocesan museum in Mantua.

Madonna del Terremoto
Roman Catholic churches completed in 1754
18th-century Roman Catholic church buildings in Italy
Baroque architecture in Mantua
1754 establishments in the Habsburg monarchy
1754 establishments in the Holy Roman Empire